Louroujina ( []; , previously  or ) is a village in Cyprus, located within the salient that marks the southernmost extent of Northern Cyprus. It was one of the largest Turkish Cypriot villages in Cyprus before the Turkish invasion of Cyprus. In 1974, Louroujina was secured so as to be placed within a contiguous Turkish Cypriot zone, which later became Northern Cyprus. The United Nations Buffer Zone separates the Louroujina salient from the area controlled by the Republic of Cyprus. There is now a tunnel which has been designed to enter the village without going through any army points. The village is now open to everyone. There are many historic untouched buildings in this village. 

Prior to 1960, Louroujina's population was Turkish Cypriots and Greek Cypriots. The Turkish Cypriots constituted a majority. The Greek Cypriots, who numbered about 100, fled the village during the Emergency years. By 1973, 1,963 Turkish Cypriots were living in Louroujina. After the Turkish invasion, the majority were relocated in nearby villages; however, about 300 opted to stay, in contravention of the authorities' demand that they vacate the village. , Louroujina had a population of 390. 

According to legend, Louroujina is so named because it was founded by a woman named "Lorenziya". In 1958, it was renamed  in Turkish, meaning "raiders". The new name is said to have been inspired by an inter-communal clash between Greek Cypriots and Louroujina Turkish Cypriots, who outnumbered the former, at Pyroi (Gaziler). In their flight, the Greek Cypriots shouted, "the Turkish Cypriots from Louroujina are flooding in".

Sports
Turkish Cypriot Akıncılar Sports Club was founded in 1942. As of 2016, it competes in Cyprus Turkish Football Association (CTFA) K-PET 2nd League.

References 

Communities in Nicosia District
Populated places in Lefkoşa District
Municipalities of Northern Cyprus